Country Code: +240
International Call Prefix: 00
Trunk Prefix:

Calling formats
To call in Equatorial Guinea, the following format is used:
 xx xxx xxxx - calls within Equatorial Guinea
 +240 yy xxx xxxx - calls from outside Equatorial Guinea
The NSN length is nine digits.

Area codes
The structure of the numbering system of the public switched telephone network is geographic, with number portability, as follows:

DN + NDC + SN = NSN = NJ XPQ MCDU

DN (Network code) = NJ 

NDC (Numbering area) = XPQ

SN (Subscriber number) = MCDU 

For landlines, 3J XPQ MCDU where J cannot be 0.

'M', 'C', 'D', and 'U' stand for thousands, hundreds, tens, and units, respectively.

Numbers beginning 4 are reserved for future fixed services.

Mobile numbers
The structure of the numbering system of the cellular mobile telephone network is non-geographic, as follows:

DN + SN = NSN = NJ XPQ MCDU

DN (Network code) = NDC = NJ

SN (Subscriber number) = XPQMCDU

Numbers beginning 2 or 5 are in use for mobile telephones.

Numbers beginning 6 and 7 are reserved for future mobile services.

Value added services
For value-added services such as freephone numbers, shared cost numbers and personal numbers,
numbers will comprise nine digits, with the following format:

80X PQMCDU, (P ≠ 0)

For valued-added services such as premium rate services for businesses, premium rate services that are leisure-related, and Internet access, numbers will comprise nine digits, with the following format:

90X PQMCDU (P ≠ 0)

Numbers for intelligent network services are non-geographic.

Allocations by operator

Fixed

 Fixed service, 3J XPQMCDU

Mobile
 Mobile service, 2J XPQMCDU and 5J XPQMCDU

Previous fixed codes

References

Equatorial Guinea
Telecommunications in Equatorial Guinea
Telephone numbers